Dawn (French: L'Aube, German: Morgengrauen) is a drama film directed by Romed Wyder, written by Billy MacKinnon and based on the novel Dawn by Elie Wiesel.

Synopsis 
Dawn is a psychological drama behind closed doors, in which four comrades in arms pressure the young Elisha to overcome his moral qualms and fully commit to the armed struggle.The story is set in Palestine in 1947, during the British mandate period. The Zionists are fighting for the establishment of a Jewish state. A member of the armed Jewish underground has been sentenced to death by the British authorities. In return, the resistance has kidnapped a British officer, trying to redeem their friend. The insurgents spend the night together, waiting for the outcome of the negotiation. If the British hang their friend at dawn, one of them will shoot the British officer held as a hostage.Based on the novel by Nobel Peace Prize winner Elie Wiesel, Dawn sheds a new light on a key moment in history that allows us to re-examine the current political disputes.

Cast 
 Joel Basman (Elisha)
 Moris Cohen (Joav)
 Sarah Adler (Ilana)
 Liron Levo (Gad)
 Rami Heuberger (Gideon)
 Jason Isaacs (Dawson)

See also 
 Dawn (1985)

References

External links 
 
 
 Review on "Dawn" | cineuropa.org

2014 films
Swiss drama films
2010s Hebrew-language films
2010s English-language films
English-language Swiss films
English-language Israeli films
English-language German films
2010s French-language films
Films about terrorism
Films set in Mandatory Palestine
Films set in the 1940s
Remakes of French films
British remakes of French films
Remakes of Hungarian films
Films based on American novels
History of Zionism
1940s in the British Empire
2014 multilingual films
Swiss multilingual films
British multilingual films
Israeli multilingual films
German multilingual films